Cinnamon is a spice obtained from the inner bark of several tree species from the genus Cinnamomum. Cinnamon is used mainly as an aromatic condiment and flavouring additive in a wide variety of cuisines, sweet and savoury dishes, breakfast cereals, snack foods, bagels, teas, hot chocolate and traditional foods. The aroma and flavour of cinnamon derive from its essential oil and principal component, cinnamaldehyde, as well as numerous other constituents including eugenol.

Cinnamon is the name for several species of trees and the commercial spice products that some of them produce. All are members of the genus Cinnamomum in the family Lauraceae. Only a few Cinnamomum species are grown commercially for spice. Cinnamomum verum (alternatively C. zeylanicum), known as "Ceylon cinnamon" after its origins in Sri Lanka (formerly Ceylon), is considered to be "true cinnamon", but most cinnamon in international commerce is derived from four other species, usually and more correctly referred to as "cassia": C. burmannii (Indonesian cinnamon or Padang cassia), C. cassia (Chinese cinnamon or Chinese cassia), C. loureiroi (Saigon cinnamon or Vietnamese cassia), and the less common C. citriodorum (Malabar cinnamon). In 2018, Indonesia and China produced 70% of the world's supply of cinnamon, Indonesia producing nearly 40% and China 30%.

Etymology
The English word "cinnamon", attested in English since the 15th century, deriving from the Ancient Greek  (later κίνναμον), via Latin and medieval French intermediate forms. The Greek was borrowed from a Phoenician word, which was similar to the related Hebrew word .

The name "cassia", first recorded in late Old English from Latin, ultimately derives from the Hebrew word  , a form of the verb  , "to strip off bark".

History 

Cinnamon has been known from remote antiquity. It was imported to Egypt as early as 2000 BC, but those who reported that it had come from China had confused it with Cinnamomum cassia, a related species. Cinnamon was so highly prized among ancient nations that it was regarded as a gift fit for monarchs and even for a deity; an inscription records the gift of cinnamon and cassia to the temple of Apollo at Miletus. Its source was kept a trade secret in the Mediterranean world for centuries by those in the spice trade, in order to protect their monopoly as suppliers.

Cinnamomum verum, which translates from Latin as "true cinnamon", is native to India, Sri Lanka, Bangladesh and Myanmar. Cinnamomum cassia (cassia) is native to China. Related species, all harvested and sold in the modern era as cinnamon, are native to Vietnam ("Saigon cinnamon"), Indonesia and other southeast Asian countries with warm climates.

In Ancient Egypt, cinnamon was used to embalm mummies. From the Ptolemaic Kingdom onward, Ancient Egyptian recipes for kyphi, an aromatic used for burning, included cinnamon and cassia. The gifts of Hellenistic rulers to temples sometimes included cassia and cinnamon.

Herodotus, Aristotle and other authors named Arabia as the source of cinnamon; they recounted that giant "cinnamon birds" collected the cinnamon sticks from an unknown land where the cinnamon trees grew and used them to construct their nests.

Pliny the Elder wrote that cinnamon was brought around the Arabian peninsula on "rafts without rudders or sails or oars", taking advantage of the winter trade winds. He also mentioned cassia as a flavouring agent for wine, and that the tales of cinnamon being collected from the nests of cinnamon birds was a traders' fiction made up to charge more. However, the story remained current in Byzantium as late as 1310.

According to Pliny the Elder, a Roman pound of cassia, cinnamon, cost up to 1,500 , the wage of fifty months' labour. Cinnamon was too expensive to be commonly used on funeral pyres in Rome, but the Emperor Nero is said to have burned a year's worth of the city's supply at the funeral for his wife Poppaea Sabina in AD 65.

Middle Ages
Through the Middle Ages, the source of cinnamon remained a mystery to the Western world. From reading Latin writers who quoted Herodotus, Europeans had learned that cinnamon came up the Red Sea to the trading ports of Egypt, but where it came from was less than clear. When the Sieur de Joinville accompanied his king, Louis IX of France to Egypt on the Seventh Crusade in 1248, he reported—and believed—what he had been told: that cinnamon was fished up in nets at the source of the Nile out at the edge of the world (i.e., Ethiopia). Marco Polo avoided precision on the topic.

The first mention that the spice grew in Sri Lanka was in Zakariya al-Qazwini's  ("Monument of Places and History of God's Bondsmen") about 1270. This was followed shortly thereafter by John of Montecorvino in a letter of about 1292.

Indonesian rafts transported cinnamon directly from the Moluccas to East Africa (see also Rhapta), where local traders then carried it north to Alexandria in Egypt. Venetian traders from Italy held a monopoly on the spice trade in Europe, distributing cinnamon from Alexandria. The disruption of this trade by the rise of other Mediterranean powers, such as the Mamluk sultans and the Ottoman Empire, was one of many factors that led Europeans to search more widely for other routes to Asia.

Early modern period
During the 1500s, Ferdinand Magellan was searching for spices on behalf of Spain, and in the Philippines found , which was closely related to C. zeylanicum, the cinnamon found in Sri Lanka. This cinnamon eventually competed with Sri Lankan cinnamon, which was controlled by the Portuguese.

In 1638, Dutch traders established a trading post in Sri Lanka, took control of the manufactories by 1640, and expelled the remaining Portuguese by 1658. "The shores of the island are full of it," a Dutch captain reported, "and it is the best in all the Orient. When one is downwind of the island, one can still smell cinnamon eight leagues out to sea." The Dutch East India Company continued to overhaul the methods of harvesting in the wild and eventually began to cultivate its own trees.

In 1767, Lord Brown of the British East India Company established Anjarakkandy Cinnamon Estate near Anjarakkandy in the Kannur district of Kerala, India. It later became Asia's largest cinnamon estate. The British took control of Ceylon from the Dutch in 1796.

Cultivation 

Cinnamon is an evergreen tree characterized by oval-shaped leaves, thick bark and a berry fruit. When harvesting the spice, the bark and leaves are the primary parts of the plant used. However, in Japan, the more pungent roots are harvested in order to produce nikki (ニッキ) which is a product distinct from cinammon (シナモン shinamon). Cinnamon is cultivated by growing the tree for two years, then coppicing it, i.e., cutting the stems at ground level. The following year, about a dozen new shoots form from the roots, replacing those that were cut. A number of pests such as Colletotrichum gloeosporioides, Diplodia species and Phytophthora cinnamomi (stripe canker) can affect the growing plants.

The stems must be processed immediately after harvesting while the inner bark is still wet. The cut stems are processed by scraping off the outer bark, then beating the branch evenly with a hammer to loosen the inner bark, which is then pried off in long rolls. Only  of the inner bark is used; the outer, woody portion is discarded, leaving metre-long cinnamon strips that curl into rolls ("quills") on drying. The processed bark dries completely in four to six hours, provided it is in a well-ventilated and relatively warm environment. Once dry, the bark is cut into  lengths for sale.

A less than ideal drying environment encourages the proliferation of pests in the bark, which may then require treatment by fumigation with sulphur dioxide.

Species 
A number of species are often sold as cinnamon:
 Cinnamomum cassia (cassia or Chinese cinnamon, the most common commercial type in the USA)
 C. burmannii (Korintje, Padang cassia, or Indonesian cinnamon)
 C. loureiroi (Saigon cinnamon, Vietnamese cassia, or Vietnamese cinnamon)
 C. verum (Sri Lanka cinnamon, Ceylon cinnamon or Cinnamomum zeylanicum)
 C. citriodorum (Malabar cinnamon)

Cassia induces a strong, spicy flavour and is often used in baking, especially associated with cinnamon rolls, as it handles baking conditions well. Among cassia, Chinese cinnamon is generally medium to light reddish-brown in colour, hard and woody in texture, and thicker ( thick), as all of the layers of bark are used. Ceylon cinnamon, using only the thin inner bark, has a lighter brown colour and a finer, less dense, and more crumbly texture. It is subtle and more aromatic in flavour than cassia and it loses much of its flavour during cooking.

The barks of the species are easily distinguished when whole, both in macroscopic and microscopic characteristics. Ceylon cinnamon sticks (quills) have many thin layers and can easily be made into powder using a coffee or spice grinder, whereas cassia sticks are much harder. Indonesian cinnamon is often sold in neat quills made up of one thick layer, capable of damaging a spice or coffee grinder. Saigon cinnamon (C. loureiroi) and Chinese cinnamon (C. cassia) are always sold as broken pieces of thick bark, as the bark is not supple enough to be rolled into quills.

The powdered bark is harder to distinguish, but if it is treated with tincture of iodine (a test for starch), little effect is visible with pure Ceylon cinnamon, but when Chinese cinnamon is present, a deep-blue tint is produced.

Grading

The Sri Lankan grading system divides the cinnamon quills into four groups:

These groups are further divided into specific grades. For example, Mexican is divided into M00000 special, M000000 and M0000, depending on quill diameter and number of quills per kilogram. Featherings are the inner bark of twigs and twisted shoots. Chips are trimmings of quills, outer and inner bark that cannot be separated, or the bark of small twigs.

Production

In 2020, four countries accounted for 98% of the world production of cinnamon, a total of 222,122 tonnes: Indonesia, China, Vietnam, and Sri Lanka.

Counterfeit
True cinnamon from C. verum bark can be mixed with cassia (C. cassia) as counterfeit and falsely marketed as authentic cinnamon. In one analysis, authentic Ceylon cinnamon bark contained 12-143 mg/kg of coumarin  a phenolic typically low in content in true cinnamon  but market samples contained coumarin with levels as high as 3462 mg/kg, indicating probable contamination with cassia in the counterfeit cinnamon. ConsumerLab.com found the same problem in a 2020 analysis; "a supplement that contained the highest amount of coumarin was labeled as Ceylon cinnamon".

Food uses 

Cinnamon bark is used as a spice. It is principally employed in cookery as a condiment and flavouring material. It is used in the preparation of chocolate, especially in Mexico. Cinnamon is often used in savoury dishes of chicken and lamb. In the United States and Europe, cinnamon and sugar are often used to flavour cereals, bread-based dishes such as toast, and fruits, especially apples; a cinnamon and sugar mixture (cinnamon sugar) is sold separately for such purposes. It is also used in Portuguese and Turkish cuisine for both sweet and savoury dishes. Cinnamon can also be used in pickling, and in Christmas drinks such as eggnog. Cinnamon powder has long been an important spice in enhancing the flavour of Persian cuisine, used in a variety of thick soups, drinks and sweets.

Nutrient composition

Ground cinnamon is 11% water, 81% carbohydrates (including 53% dietary fiber), 4% protein and 1% fat.

Characteristics

Texture

Ceylon cinnamon may be crushed into small pieces by hand while Indonesian cinnamon requires a powerful blender.

Flavour, aroma and taste
The flavour of cinnamon is due to an aromatic essential oil that makes up 0.5 to 1% of its composition. This essential oil can be prepared by roughly pounding the bark, macerating it in sea water, and then quickly distilling the whole. It is of a golden-yellow colour, with the characteristic odour of cinnamon and a very hot aromatic taste. The pungent taste and scent come from cinnamaldehyde (about 90% of the essential oil from the bark) and, by reaction with oxygen as it ages, it darkens in colour and forms resinous compounds.

Cinnamon constituents include some 80 aromatic compounds, including eugenol, found in the oil from leaves or bark of cinnamon trees.

Alcohol flavourant

Health-related research
Cinnamon has a long history of use in traditional medicine as a digestive aid, however, contemporary studies are unable to find evidence of any significant medicinal or therapeutic effect.

Reviews of clinical trials reported lowering of fasting plasma glucose and inconsistent effects on hemoglobin A1C (HbA1c, an indicator of chronically elevated plasma glucose). Four of the reviews reported a decrease in fasting plasma glucose, only two reported lower HbA1c, and one reported no change to either measure. The Cochrane review noted that trial durations were limited to 4 to 16 weeks, and that no trials reported on changes to quality of life, morbidity or mortality rate. The Cochrane authors' conclusion was: "There is insufficient evidence to support the use of cinnamon for type 1 or type 2 diabetes mellitus." Citing the Cochrane review, the U.S. National Center for Complementary and Integrative Health stated: "Studies done in people don't support using cinnamon for any health condition." However, the results of the studies are difficult to interpret because it is often unclear what type of cinnamon and what part of the plant were used.

A meta-analysis of cinnamon supplementation trials with lipid measurements reported lower total cholesterol and triglycerides, but no significant changes in LDL-cholesterol or HDL-cholesterol. Another reported no change to body weight or insulin resistance.

Toxicity

A systematic review of adverse events as a result of cinnamon use reported gastrointestinal disorders and allergic reactions as the most frequently reported side effects.

In 2008, the European Food Safety Authority considered the toxicity of coumarin, a component of cinnamon, and confirmed a maximum recommended tolerable daily intake (TDI) of 0.1 mg of coumarin per kg of body weight. Coumarin is known to cause liver and kidney damage in high concentrations and metabolic effect in humans with CYP2A6 polymorphism. Based on this assessment, the European Union set a guideline for maximum coumarin content in foodstuffs of 50 mg per kg of dough in seasonal foods, and 15 mg per kg in everyday baked foods. The maximum recommended TDI of 0.1 mg of coumarin per kg of body weight equates to 5 mg of coumarin (or 5.6 g C. verum with 0.9 mg coumarin per gram) for a body weight of 50 kg. C as shown in the table below:

Due to the variable amount of coumarin in C. cassia, usually well over 1.0 mg of coumarin per g of cinnamon and sometimes up to 12 times that, C. cassia has a low safe-intake-level upper limit to adhere to the above TDI. In contrast, C. verum has only trace amounts of coumarin.

Gallery

See also 

 Canella, a plant known as "wild cinnamon" or "white cinnamon"
 Cinnamomea, a New Latin adjective meaning 'cinnamon-coloured'
 Cinnamon challenge
 List of culinary herbs and spices

Notes

References

Further reading
 Wijesekera R. O. B., Ponnuchamy S., Jayewardene A. L., "Cinnamon" (1975) monograph published by CISIR, Colombo, Sri Lanka

External links 

 "In pictures: Sri Lanka's spice of life". BBC News.

 
Antifungals
Cinnamomum
Incense material
Medicinal plants
Non-timber forest products
Spices
Indian spices
Sri Lankan spices